EgyptSat 1 or MisrSat-1 was Egypt's first Earth remote sensing satellite. This satellite was jointly built by Egypt's National Authority for Remote Sensing and Space Sciences together with the Yuzhnoye Design Bureau in Ukraine and was launched on board a Dnepr rocket on 17 April 2007 from the Baikonur Cosmodrome.

The effort was spearheaded by Dr. Aly Sadek, chairman of the Egyptian Council for Space Science and Technology Research. It in many ways was considered a huge step for the Egyptians since it marked the first time they opted for technology transfer during the manufacturing the satellite rather than simply purchasing one (as in case of the Nilesat satellites). On 23 October 2010, the National Authority for Remote Sensing and Space Sciences announced that control and communication with the satellite had been lost since July 2010.

History
In 2001, Egypt posted an international tender for the development of the first Egyptian satellite for the observation and remote sensing and bidders from Ukraine, UK, Russia, Korea and Italy competed for the deal.

on June 26, 2001 KB Yuzhnoe design bureau from Ukraine announced winner and on October 24, a contract had been signed in Egypt.

A consortium consisted of KB Yuzhnoe design bureau and sub-contractors Ukrainian companies:
 Yuzhnoye - prime contractor responsible for the platform and the launch
 Yuzhmash - Scientific Research Institute of Radio Engineering Measurements
 Khartron-Konsat and Khartron-Yukom - Research and Scientific Production Enterprises
 KONEX - State Research and Production Enterprise
 CONECS - responsible for the development of the two optical payloads, the onboard payload command and data handling subsystem, as well as for the development of the data processing in the ground segment
 Arsenal - optics manufacturing

Achievements and future plans
EgyptSat 1 Launched successfully on April 17, 2007.
EgyptSat 2 launched into orbit 16 April 2014; last contact with the satellite was April 14, 2015.  

The objective of the three satellites is to provide comprehensive images of Egypt.

Equipment 
Egyptsat 1 is considered a miniaturized satellite weighing 100 kg and is carrying two devices: an infrared sensing device and a high resolution multispectral imager together with store and forward communications payload.

See also 

 EgyptSat 2
 2007 in spaceflight
 Egyptian Space Program

References

External links
 http://space.skyrocket.de/doc_sdat/egyptsat-1.htm
 Egypt to launch first spy satellite
 Egypt to launch its first scientific satellite 
 Egypt to launch first scientific satellite in late 2007
 http://www.nilesat.com.eg

Earth imaging satellites
Spacecraft launched in 2007
Satellites of Egypt
2007 in Egypt
Spacecraft launched by Dnepr rockets